Warner Bros. Discovery Networks Asia-Pacific is a subsidiary of Warner Bros. Discovery that operates several television channels in Asia and Australasia, along with the Discovery+ streaming service.

In April 2022, WarnerMedia Entertainment Networks Asia Pacific (founded in 1989) merged with Discovery Asia-Pacific (founded in 1994) after their owners, WarnerMedia (then owned by AT&T before being spun off), merged with Discovery, Inc. It has consequently been announced that Discovery+ will become one with HBO Max.

Operating channels 
CNN International Asia Pacific

Pan-Asia 
 Animal Planet
 Asian Food Network
 Cartoon Network
 Boomerang
 Cinemax Asia
 Discovery Asia
 Discovery Channel
 Discovery Science
 DMAX
 Eurosport
 EVE
 Food Network Asia
 TLC
Travel Channel

East Asia 

 Animal Planet Japan
 Boomerang Korea
 Cartoon Network Japan
 Cartoon Network Korea
 Cartoon Network Taiwan
 CNN Japan
 Discovery Channel Japan
 Discovery Channel Korea
 Mondo TV (Japan)
 Tabi Channel

Southeast Asia 

 Boomerang Asia
 Boomerang Thailand
 Cartoon Network Philippines
 CNN Indonesia (licensed to Trans Media)
 CNN International Asia Pacific
 CNN Philippines (licensed to Nine Media Corporation)
 Food Network Asia
 HBO Asia
 HBO Hits
 HBO Family
 HBO Signature
 World Heritage Channel

South Asia 
 Cartoon Network India
Cartoon Network HD+
 Cartoon Network Pakistan
  CNN International India
 Pogo
 Animal Planet India 
 Discovery Channel India
 HGTV India 
 Travel Channel
 Food Network Asia
 Discovery Tamil India
 Discovery Science India
 Discovery Turbo India
 Discovery Kids India 
 Eurosport India
 Investigation Discovery India
 TLC India

Australia and New Zealand 
 Animal Planet
 Cartoon Network
 CNN International Asia Pacific
 Discovery
 Discovery Turbo
 HGTV
 ID
 TLC

Australia only 
 9Rush (co-owned with Nine)
 Boomerang
 Travel Channel

New Zealand only 

 Bravo (co-owned with NBCUniversal International Networks)
 Eden
 Living
 Rush
 Three

Defunct 
 7food network (licensed)
 Boomerang Japan
 Breeze TV
 China Entertainment Television (36%)
 The Edge TV
 Food Network (New Zealand)
 HBO South Asia
 HBO Defined
 HBO Hits
 WB Channel
 Toonami India
 Imagine TV
 Imagine Showbiz
 Oh!K
 Lumiere Movies
 Mondo Mah-jong TV
 Real
 Red by HBO
 SBS Food Network (licensed)
 Setanta Sports Asia
 Tabi Tele
 Toonami Asia
 TruTV Asia
 Turner Classic Movies Asia

Carriage disputes with StarHub 
On May 30, 2018, StarHub announces it plans to discontinue seven Discovery channels, marking the end of partnership between Discovery and StarHub for more than 20 years, including Discovery Channel, Animal Planet, TLC, Discovery Asia, Discovery Science, Eurosport, and Setanta Sports on both StarHub TV and streaming service (StarHub GO) at the end of June 30 due to StarHub's unpaid carriage fees and price increase. Discovery's expanded lifestyle channels, with the exception of HGTV, Asian Food Channel, Food Network and Travel Channel on both platforms are ceased transmission on August 31. On July 3, all seven Discovery channels was replaced by Gusto TV (until 23 November 2020),  CuriosityStream HD, Travelxp HD, Makeful HD, Fight Sports HD, GEM TV HD, and Colors Tamil HD. In the meanwhile, all Discovery channels (including HGTV, Food Network and Asian Food Channel, Exclude Eurosport until Resume on Air from 1 October 2021) will continue to air on Singtel TV.

References 

 
Warner Bros. Discovery subsidiaries
Mass media companies of Singapore
Mass media companies established in 1989
Mass media companies established in 1994
Television broadcasting companies of India
Mass media companies of India
Television networks in India
Broadcasting